Carl Alving is an American internist, currently at Walter Reed Army Institute of Research and an Elected Fellow of the American Association for the Advancement of Science.

References

Fellows of the American Association for the Advancement of Science
American internists
Living people
Year of birth missing (living people)